Charles Edwin Disbrow (November 5, 1812 – November 3, 1853) was Warden of the Borough of Norwalk, Connecticut from 1852 to 1853. He worked from 1815 to 1850 as a silversmith and jeweler in Norwalk. He was the son of Caleb Disbrow and Martha Greene.

References 

1812 births
1853 deaths
American silversmiths
Mayors of Norwalk, Connecticut
Politicians from New Haven, Connecticut
People from Westport, Connecticut
19th-century American politicians